In the United States, a loosie (or loosey) is a single cigarette that is purchased or sold.

Cigarettes are required be sold in quantities of no less than 20.  The sale of loose cigarettes was outlawed because of Loosies' potential appeal to children.  Loosies are commonly found in low-income areas. The high cost of cigarettes due to increased taxation has been blamed for increased sales of loosies. 

In 2014, Eric Garner was killed when NYPD officers attempted to arrest him for allegedly selling loosies.

References

Smoking in the United States
English-language slang